Hattie Delaro (1861 – April 18, 1941) was an American actress. She had a career in theater, then became an actress in silent film in the 1910s and 1920s.

Delaro was born in Brooklyn.

Delaro debuted on stage in 1881 at Brooklyn's Grand Opera House "in a repertory of comic operas". She portrayed Melissa in the first authorized New York production of Gilbert and Sullivan's Princess Ida in 1884 and an 1885 production of The Mikado at Hollis Street Theatre in Boston, Massachusetts. In 1888, she was in the production The Queen's Mate. Her other Broadway credits included The Pearl of Pekin (1889), Mam'selle 'Awkins (1900), and Babes in Toyland (1903)

She began her film career in 1913 short film Love in an Apartment Hotel.

Delaro was married to attorney William S. Barnes. She died on April 18, 1941 in New York at age 80.

Filmography

References

External links 

 
 

American silent film actresses
1861 births
1941 deaths
American film actresses
20th-century American actresses